Geoffrey Owen Nulty (born 13 February 1949) is an English retired professional footballer who played as a midfielder. His career was blighted by injury and was ended prematurely after a tackle by Jimmy Case in the Liverpool versus Everton Merseyside derby in 1980.

After retiring as a player, Nulty became a coach with Preston and later worked as sub-postmaster as well as developing business interests.

Career statistics
Source:

References

External links

1949 births
Living people
Sportspeople from Prescot
English footballers
Association football midfielders
St Helens Town A.F.C. players
Stoke City F.C. players
Burnley F.C. players
Newcastle United F.C. players
Everton F.C. players
English Football League players
Preston North End F.C. non-playing staff